The 11th Mississippi Infantry Regiment was an infantry regiment that served in the Confederate States Army during the American Civil War.

Overview 
The 11th Mississippi Infantry Regiment was established at Corinth, Mississippi, in May, 1861, and mustered at Lynchburg, Virginia. The regiment saw action at the Battle of First Manassas under General Barnard Elliott Bee, before being assigned to the Army of Northern Virginia.

Commanders 

 Col. F. M. Green
 Col. Philip F. Liddell
 Col. William H. Moore
 Col. Reuben O. Reynolds
 Lt. Col. Samuel F. Butler
 Lt. Col. William B. Lowry
 Lt. Col. George W. Shannon
 Maj. T. S. Evans
 Maj. Alexander H. Franklin

See also 

 List of Mississippi Civil War Confederate units
 11th Mississippi Infantry Monument
 University Greys

References

Further reading 

 Stubbs, Steven Howard (2000). Duty, Honor, Valor: The Story of the Eleventh Mississippi Infantry Regiment. Philadelphia, MI: Dancing Rabbit Press. 948 pages.

Units and formations of the Confederate States Army from Mississippi
Military units and formations disestablished in 1865